Vrådal Church is a parish church of the Church of Norway in Kviteseid Municipality in Vestfold og Telemark county, Norway. It is located in the village of Vrådal. It is one of the churches in the Kviteseid parish which is part of the Øvre Telemark prosti (deanery) in the Diocese of Agder og Telemark. The white, wooden church was built in a long church design in 1887 using plans drawn up by the architect Christian Grosch. The church seats about 170 people.

History

The earliest existing historical records of the church date back to the year 1395, but the church was not built that year. The church was possibly built during the 1300s. In 1668, the church is described as in quite poor condition. In 1685, the old church was torn down and a new timber-framed, octagonal church was built on the same site. It is said that this church may have been the first octagonal designed church in Norway. The new church was consecrated in 1886. The octagonal church had a steep octagonal roof with a  tower. There were no supporting columns inside the church, so that the tower was supported by huge beams that rested on the outer walls and laid in a large cross. In the tower there were two church bells and strings to these hung down in the church room through the ceiling. During the 19th century, it was expanded with an extension for the choir. The parish residents bought the church for 110 rigsdaler in 1726.

By the 1880s, the old octagonal church had become too small for the parish. The new church was designed by Christian Grosch as a wooden long church. The church has a west tower (which is surrounded by a stairwell), a rectangular nave, a choir that is the same width of the nave. There is a sacristy that extends to the east from the choir. The new church was completed in 1887 and consecrated on 17 June 1887. The last service in the old church was held on 19 May 1887 and then the old church was closed. The pulpit, altarpiece, baptismal font, brass candlesticks, and some other furnishings from the old church were moved to  the church. The old church building was demolished in 1888.

See also
List of churches in Agder og Telemark

References

Kviteseid
Churches in Vestfold og Telemark
Long churches in Norway
Wooden churches in Norway
19th-century Church of Norway church buildings
Churches completed in 1887
14th-century establishments in Norway